Cottam railway station was a station in Cottam, Nottinghamshire, England which is now closed.  Part of the route on which the station was located remained in use for freight trains serving Cottam power stations, with the final train running in September 2019. The line is now officially closed, and hasn't been used since then. The line through to Saxilby and Lincoln  via Torksey closed to passengers in November 1959.

References

Disused railway stations in Nottinghamshire
Former Great Central Railway stations
Railway stations in Great Britain opened in 1850
Railway stations in Great Britain closed in 1959